The All Saints Cathedral, also called Santa Fe Cathedral, is the main Catholic church and, since 1934, mother church of the Archdiocese of Santa Fe de la Vera Cruz. It is located on the street Bigradier Estanislao Lopez in the city of Santa Fe, Santa Fe province, Argentina.

The building was constructed in 1573 in the old city of Santa Fe (now Cayastá). In 1651, Santa Fe was moved to its present location and the church was moved and rebuilt on its current site. It was subsequently renovated in 1833 and again in 1947, when the building’s three naves were constructed. In 1942, All Saints was declared a National Historical Monument.

See also
Roman Catholicism in Argentina
All Saints Cathedral

References

Roman Catholic cathedrals in Argentina
Buildings and structures in Santa Fe Province
Roman Catholic churches completed in 1649
Buildings and structures in Santa Fe, Argentina
17th-century Roman Catholic church buildings